A partial solar eclipse occurred on September 20–21, 1960. A solar eclipse occurs when the Moon passes between Earth and the Sun, thereby totally or partly obscuring the image of the Sun for a viewer on Earth. A partial solar eclipse occurs in the polar regions of the Earth when the center of the Moon's shadow misses the Earth.
It began in northeast Russia near sunrise on September 21, and ended near sunset over North America on September 20, one day earlier because of the effects of the International Date Line.

Related eclipses

Solar eclipses of 1957–1960

References

Eclipse of the Sun of September 20, 1960—Sky and Telescope magazine, volume 20, page 129.

External links
http://eclipse.gsfc.nasa.gov/SEplot/SEplot1951/SE1960Sep20P.GIF
http://eclipse.gsfc.nasa.gov/SEsearch/SEdata.php?Ecl=19600920

1960 9 20
1960 in science
1960 9 20
September 1960 events